The 1977 FA Charity Shield was the 55th FA Charity Shield, an annual football match played between the winners of the previous season's First Division and FA Cup competitions. The match was played on 13 August 1977 at Wembley Stadium and contested by Liverpool, who had won the 1976–77 First Division, and Manchester United, who had won the 1976–77 FA Cup. The teams played out a goalless draw and shared the Charity Shield.

Match details

See also
1976–77 Football League
1976–77 FA Cup

External links
Report at lfchistory.net

1977
Charity Shield 1977
Charity Shield 1977
Charity Shield
FA Charity Shield
Fa Charity Shield